Saloli is a large village located in Reni Tehsil of Alwar district, Rajasthan with total 550 families residing. The Saloli village has population of 2807 of which 1488 are males while 1319 are females as per Population Census 2011.

In Saloli village population of children with age 0-6 is 437 which make up 15.57% of total population of village. Average Sex Ratio of Saloli village is 886 which are lower than Rajasthan state average of 928. Child Sex Ratio for the Saloli as per census is 1005, higher than Rajasthan average of 888.

Saloli village has lower literacy rate compared to Rajasthan. In 2011, literacy rate of Saloli village was 64.51% compared to 66.11% of Rajasthan. In Saloli Male literacy stands at 79.06% while female literacy rate was 47.73%.

According to Census 2011 information the location code or village code of Saloli village is 073419. Saloli village is located in Rajgarh Tehsil of Alwar district in Rajasthan, India. It is situated 15 km away from sub-district headquarter Rajgarh and 48 km away from district headquarter Alwar. As per 2009 stats, Saloli village is also a gram panchayat.
The total geographical area of village is 453 hectares. Saloli has a total population of 2,807 peoples. Rajgarh is nearest town to Saloli which is approximately 15 km away.
As per constitution of India and Panchyati Raj Act, Saloli village is administrated by Sarpanch (Head of Village) who is elected representative of village.
Saloli Gram Panchayat has many government employees, private sector employees (Engineers, marketing managers, metro employees, professors and assistant professors), self-employment (shops, marketing and others) and agriculture based. Most of the employees are in the teaching sector, the multinational companies, police department (Delhi Police and Rajasthan Police . saloli village is situated in Delhi NCR

Transportation 
The nearest Railway Station is Rajgarh (15 km from Saloli), apart from it Bandikui Railway Station is also a nearby railway station to Saloli. However, Alwar Junction is major railway station 46 km near to Saloli.Connectivity of Saloli
Connectivity of Saloli: 
Public Bus Service
Available within 5 – 10 km distance

Private Bus Service
Available within 5 – 10 km distance

Railway Station
Available within 14 km distance
Villages In Saloli Panchayat:
1.	Buchpuri
2.	Kharkhari Rana
3.	Saloli
Other nearby villages to Saloli are :- 
Machari
Ishwana
Babeli
Makroda
Barh Makroda
Tahtara
Dera

Saloli Data:

Particulars	    Total	Male	Female
Total No. of Houses:535	        -	-
Population	    2,807	1,488	1,319
Child (0-6)	    437	        218	219
Schedule Caste	    710	        370	340
Schedule Tribe	    314	        159	155
Literacy	    64.51%	79.06%	47.73%
Total Workers	    1,258	731	527
Main Worker	    724	        0	0
Marginal Worker	    534	        164	370

History
Saloli was a Jagir of Kalyanot/Kalyanwat Rajputs (One of the 12 Royal Kacchawaha Chambers known as "barah kothri" of House of Amber) in the erstwhile Alwar State. Kalyanot is a sub clan of Rajawat clan of Kachawaha Suryavanshi lineage. The Jagir was granted to Thakur Saal Singh Kalyanot , one of the descendants of King Prithviraj of Amber. The name Saloli is derived form the name of its founder Thakur Saal Singh. Other brothers of Thakur Saal Singh were Thakur Baal Singh , who founded Babeli in erstwhile Alwar State and Thakur Bhaav Singh , who founded Bhaogarh near Sikrai (Dausa). Saloli , Babeli and Bhaogarh shares the same familial linage.

Present position 
The village consists of Rajputs, Meena, Jogis, Bhramins (Gaur), Nai castes people. Most of the people in Saloli had migrated to cities due to a scarcity of water in the Village and lack of employment.

References 

Villages in Alwar district